The Miss World Malaysia 2012 was held at the Zouk Club KL on July 13, 2012. The winner is Lee Yvonne from Kuala Lumpur. All seventeen contestants from different states competed for the crown. Lee represented Malaysia at the Miss World 2013 & was unplaced. She then crowned her successor, Melinder Bhullar of Kuala Lumpur on the 1 August 2013 at the Corus Hotel, Kuala Lumpur.

Results

Special awards

Judges
 Tho Tuck Wah - Managing Director, Redberry Ambient
 Jess Teong - Actress & Movie Producer
 Dr. Dalilah Kamaruddin - National Cancer Society of Malaysia (NCSM)
 Kenne Yam - Movie Executive Producer & Director
 JD - Announcer/Mix FM
 Ikmal Nizam Arrifin - COO MBO
 Huang Jing Que - Health Care Specialist, Chief Judge of Miss Universe Chinese finals
 Chris Tong Bing Yu - K-Link Skin Care Ambassador, Actress, Singer, Pianist, Drummer & Host
 Henley Hii - Singer, Actor & Producer, Winner of Project Superstar

Official Contestants

References 

2012 beauty pageants
Beauty pageants in Malaysia
2012